Joshua Sparling  (born 1981) is a Corporal in the  U.S. Army from Port Huron, Michigan, who was wounded in the War in Iraq.  Since December 2005, Joshua has received significant publicity for being the victim of multiple incidents of aggression, attributed to his status as a veteran of the War in Iraq.

Injury
Joshua Sparling was injured in Iraq by an IED on November 20, 2005, and returned to the U.S. on November 24, 2005, where he underwent multiple surgeries to treat his wounds, including severe injuries to his right leg.   According to a letter written by Sparling's father,  on the day he arrived at Walter Reed Army Medical Center in Washington, D.C., Sparling received a letter from the Red Cross that turned out to be anonymous hate mail expressing the wish that the soldier reading the card would die.

Spitting incident
On 27 January 2007, at an antiwar protest at Washington DC, a protester wearing an Airborne jacket spit near him, according to the New York Times.  Sparling spat back, according to the NY Times report,  an allegation that Sparling denied during a Hannity and Colmes interview on the Fox News.

Supportive publicity
Sparling's experiences have been featured by numerous media outlets and weblogs supportive of the Iraq War effort.  Media coverage of the death wish triggered an outpouring of over 20,000 cards and gifts to wounded soldiers at Walter Reed.  Sparling was championed by Fox News commentator Sean Hannity, who gave him gifts of several movies and an iPod.  He has also appeared and spoken at Oliver North's "Freedom Alliance" concerts.  Additionally, Sparling and his parents were invited to and attended the 2006 State of the Union Address as guests of J. Dennis Hastert.

References

External links
 Brenner, Anita  That your words may be put to the test La Canada Valley Sun
Hullaballoo No Spit Zone
Hullaballoo Spitting Image
 Kilmeade, Brian  Insult to Injury Fox News
 Malkin, Michelle  Good wishes for Joshua Sparling Malkin Blog
 Murphy, Shannon Wounded soldier flooded with goodwill messages Port Huron Times Herald
 Murphy, Shannon Some 20,000 well-wishers pen soldier who got hate mail Lansing State Journal
The Sean Hannity Show link to video from The Political Teen Blog
The Gunn Nutt Airport insult incident
New York Times Protest Focuses on Iraq Troop Increase

1981 births
Living people
United States Army personnel of the Iraq War
United States Army non-commissioned officers